Tartan Senior High School is a public secondary school in Oakdale, Minnesota, United States. It is a member of Independent School District 622. Since its opening in 1971, Tartan has grown to more than 1,800 students supported by 120-plus teachers, administrators, aides, custodians, administrative assistants and other support staff. Tartan offers a comprehensive academic program consisting of core courses as well as a wide range of electives in the fine arts, industrial technologies, business education, world languages and cultures, and others. The school mascot is the Titan and its colors are Black, Silver, White and Royal Blue.

Publications 
 Calliope is Tartan's annual publication of original student artwork, poetry, photographs, comics, and short stories.
 Plaid Press is the student-produced, faculty-advised newspaper.
 Tartan Torch is Tartan's yearbook.

Athletics and extracurriculars 
The Titans compete in the Metro East Conference. The Athletic Director of Tartan High is Bryan Munter. Boys compete in seven varsity sports: baseball, basketball, football, hockey, lacrosse, soccer, and wrestling. Girls also compete in seven varsity sports: basketball, hockey, lacrosse, soccer, softball, dance, and volleyball.

Cancer cluster 
The quality of Washington County's drinking water, poisoned by chemicals from 3M, has been blamed for an outbreak of cancer and other diseases at the school.

References

External links 
Tartan High School Home

1971 establishments in Minnesota
Educational institutions established in 1971
Public high schools in Minnesota
Schools in Washington County, Minnesota